Machiel de Graaf (born 26 June 1969) is a Dutch politician and physical therapist. As a member of the Party for Freedom (PVV) he was a member of the Senate as well as Senate group leader from 7 June 2011 to 20 September 2012. He has been an MP since 20 September 2012. He has already been a PVV member of the municipal council of The Hague since 11 March 2010 as well as fraction leader since 20 January 2011.

De Graaf origins from a family of fishermen of Scheveningen. Educated as a physiotherapist, he worked in this branch from 1995 to 1999 and as a salesmanager in the pharmaceutical industry from 1999 to 2008. Since 15 November 2010 he has been working for the parliamentary group of the PVV.

References 
  Parlement.com biography

External links 
  Senate biography

1969 births
Living people
Members of the House of Representatives (Netherlands)
Members of the Senate (Netherlands)
Municipal councillors of The Hague
Party for Freedom politicians
People in health professions from The Hague
Dutch physiotherapists
21st-century Dutch politicians
20th-century Dutch people